Shelby Township is one of thirteen townships in Tippecanoe County, Indiana, United States. As of the 2010 census, its population was 2,352 and it contained 920 housing units.

Geography

Cities, towns, villages
 Otterbein (east half)

Unincorporated communities
 Montmorenci at 
 Old Halfway at 
(This list is based on USGS data and may include former settlements.)

Extinct towns
 LaGrange

Adjacent townships
 Round Grove Township, White County (north)
 Wabash Township (east)
 Wayne Township (south)
 Davis Township, Fountain County (southwest)
 Medina Township, Warren County (southwest)
 Warren Township, Warren County (southwest)
 Bolivar Township, Benton County (west)
 Pine Township, Benton County (northwest)

Cemeteries
The township contains these four cemeteries: Asbury, Shambaugh, Spencer, and Montmorenci.

Major highways
  US Route 52
  US Route 231

Airports and landing strips
 Sutton Airport

School districts
 Benton Community School Corporation
 Tippecanoe School Corporation

Political districts
 Indiana's 4th congressional district
 State House District 26
 State Senate District 22

Education
 Benton Community School Corporation

References
 United States Census Bureau 2007 TIGER/Line Shapefiles
 United States Board on Geographic Names (GNIS)
 United States National Atlas

External links
 Indiana Township Association
 United Township Association of Indiana

Townships in Tippecanoe County, Indiana
Lafayette metropolitan area, Indiana
Townships in Indiana